Louis Kemper (1870 – October 9, 1914) was an American labor unionist.

Born in Hudson, New York, Kemper completed an apprenticeship as a brewer in New York City.  He joined the National Union of the United Brewery Workmen of the United States, and in about 1899 moved to Union, New Jersey, to work as an organizer for the union, becoming secretary of the union local he founded there.

In 1901, Kemper was elected as corresponding and financial secretary of the Brewery Workmen, moving to Cincinnati.  The role was split in 1904, with Kemper continuing as corresponding secretary of the union.  In 1912, he served as the American Federation of Labor's delegate to the British Trades Union Congress.

In 1914, Kemper was a founder of the Home Rule Amendment League and the Labor Home Rule League, organizations which opposed Prohibition.  He caught pneumonia, and died in October, 1914.

References

1870 births
1914 deaths
American trade union leaders
People from Hudson, New York
Trade unionists from New York (state)